Tadpole's Promise is a British children's picture book written by Jeanne Willis and illustrated by Tony Ross, published in 2003. It won the Nestlé Smarties Book Prize Silver Award and was longlisted for the Kate Greenaway Medal.

References

2003 children's books
British children's books
British picture books
Books about frogs